Olivier Le Jeune (died ) was the first recorded slave purchased in New France.

Olivier was a young boy from Madagascar, believed to have been approximately seven years of age when he was brought to the French colonial settlement of Quebec in New France by Scottish privateer David Kirke or one of his brothers, Lewis and Thomas Kirke during their capture of the settlement on behalf of the English Crown. Shortly afterwards, the boy was sold to Olivier Le Baillif, a French clerk in the pay of the expeditionary force which captured the settlement.

When Quebec was handed back to the French in 1632, Le Baillif left the colony and gave his slave to a Quebec resident, Guillemette Couillard.  The boy was educated in a school established by the Jesuit priest, Father Le Jeune. In 1632, the boy said to Father Le Jeune: "You say that by baptism I shall be like you: I am black and you are white, I must have my skin taken off to be like you." Nevertheless, Father Le Jeune baptised him as Olivier in 1633, after the colony's head clerk, Olivier Letardif. Olivier later adopted the name Le Jeune, the surname of the Jesuit priest.

Olivier Le Jeune died on 10 May 1654.  It is believed that by the time of his death his official status was changed from that of slave to that of free "domestic servant".

Although he is often referred to as a black African from Madagascar, he may have been of partial Malay ancestry, which would have been quite common owing to the fact that Madagascar had been originally settled by diverse peoples of Southeast Asia and Oceania as well as Africa.

See also
 Black Canadian
 List of kidnappings
 Slavery in Canada
 Underground Railroad

References

External links 
Biography at the Dictionary of Canadian Biography Online

1654 deaths
1621 births
Black Canadian people
Canadian people of Malagasy descent
Canadian slaves
Kidnapped African children
Malagasy slaves
People of New France
Year of birth unknown